The Timur Ruby (also Khiraj-i-alam, "Tribute to the World") is an unfaceted,  polished red spinel set in a necklace. It is named after the ruler Timur, founder of the Timurid Empire and purportedly one of its former owners. It was believed to be a ruby until 1851.

It is inscribed with the titles of five of its previous owners: Jahangir (who also had the name of his father Akbar the Great inscribed), Shah Jahan, Farrukhsiyar, Nader Shah and Ahmad Shah Durrani.

Since 1612, the owners of the Timur ruby have also owned the Koh-i-Noor diamond. It has been in the possessions of the Safavid, Mughal, Sikh and British empires, and is currently part of the British crown jewels
.

History

Origins 
Spinels are found in various parts of the world, including the Transoxiana region that was home to the Mughal ancestors.

The Timur ruby is historically associated with Timur, who was believed to have taken the gem during the invasion of Delhi in 1398. In 1996, however, research indicated that it was never owned by Timur.

Possession of the Mughal emperors 
During the seventeenth century, the gem was in the ownership of Shah Abbas I, the Safavid Emperor of Persia. In 1612 he gave it to the Mughal Emperor Janangir. Jahangir had it engraved with his own name and that of his father (Akbar the Great).

The stone passed to subsequent Mughal Emperors, including Shah Jahan (who had it set in the Peacock Throne) and Aurangzeb. Shah Jahan and Farrukhsiyar also inscribed their names on the stone.

Removal from India 
In 1739 Persian ruler Nader Shah seized the gem during his occupation of Delhi. Nader took the Peacock Throne as part of his treasure, but removed the Timur ruby and the Koh-i-Noor diamond to wear on an armband. He called the Timur ruby the "Ayn al-Hur" ("Eye of the Houri), and added to its inscription.

In 1747 Nader Shah was assassinated. The Timur ruby was taken by his commander Ahmad Shah Durrani, who became King of Afghanistan.

Return to the Punjab 
In 1810 it returned to India when Ahmad Shah's grandson Shah Shujah was forced into exile in the Punjab. In 1813 Maharaja Ranjit Singh took possession of the gem. It subsequently passed into the ownership of Maharaja Sher Singh (1841) and Maharaja Duleep Singh.

Removal to London 
When the East India Company invaded Punjab in 1849, they took possession of the Timur ruby and the Koh-i-Noor diamond from Duleep Singh.

In 1851 the Timur ruby was displayed at the Great Exhibition in London. That year, it was also reclassified as a spinel rather than a ruby. After the Great Exhibition closed the Court of Directors of the East India Company presented the gem to Queen Victoria as a gift after which it became her private possession.

Crown jewels 
The gem was set in a necklace by Garrards in 1853. Shortly afterwards, it was modified so that it could hold the Koh-i-Noor as an occasional alternative.

After the necklace was lengthened in 1911, it was rarely worn.

The spinel is now part of the British crown jewels.

See also
 List of individual gemstones

References

External links
The 'Timur Ruby' necklace at the Royal Collection

Individual necklaces
Medieval India
British East India Company
Sikh Empire
Jewels of the Mughal Empire
Individual spinels
Crown Jewels of the United Kingdom